Salas District is one of fourteen districts of the province Ica in Peru.

References

1925 establishments in Peru